Débora Lima Falabella (born 22 February 1979) is a Brazilian actress.

Early years 

Débora was born in Belo Horizonte City, the daughter of actor Rogério Falabella and the lyrical singer Maria Olympia.

During her childhood she became interested in acting and began to participate in plays. At fifteen she released her first professional play, Flicts, written by Ziraldo.

Falabella continued acting in dramas. In her teens, she was one of the protagonists of the young adult telenovela Chiquititas. She lived for a time in Argentina, where the story was filmed.

Career 

After becoming an adult, she went to college to study advertising but then abandoned her studies when she received better offers. In a casting for actors, Falabella got her entrance into the most famous Brazilian television network, Rede Globo, in one of the seasons of the young adult series Malhação in 1998.

After that the actress returned to her hometown to continue her work in theater, and eventually made a small role in the 1999 miniseries Mulher.

In 2001, Débora premiered on Rede Globo telenovela starring in Um Anjo Caiu do Céu. Her talent impressed and she was called to join the main cast O Clone, and despite being among big players, young actress has been attracting attention for her brilliant performance, and earned her the award for Best Actress in Domingão Faustão.

Falabella also began starring in films such as Françoise, for which she was awarded Best Actress at the Festivals of Gramado and Brasilia, and received an honorable mention at the BR River Festival 2001; Dois Perdidos numa Noite Suja, a 2002 film directed by José Joffily, for which she won awards for best actress in Brazil and a cinema Candango trophy; 2003 Lisbela e o Prisioneiro, and in 2004 Cazuza with Daniel de Oliveira. In the same year she also starred in the romantic comedy A Dona da História with the actor Rodrigo Santoro, directed by Daniel Filho.

In the miniseries JK she played the role of Sarah Kubitschek, wife of Brazilian president Juscelino Kubitschek. In 2006 she was cast to the leading role in the Emmy -nominated telenovela Sinhá Moça. In 2007, director Daniel Filho, called on her again to star in the film Primo Basílio, where again Débora excels at acting.

In 2011, she played Clarisse, one of the main characters in the Emmy winner series, The Invisible Woman, and starred again with actor Rodrigo Santoro, in the films My Country and Homens do Bem.

In 2012, Falabella returned to telenovelas, starring in the most successful television production, Avenida Brasil receiving several nominations for Best Lead Actress. In 2014, she portrayed Ray, the girlfriend of a serial killer, in the series Dupla Identidade, Glória Perez.

Personal life 
Falabella has a sister, the actress Cynthia Falabella, in 2005 she married Eduardo Hipolitho (better known as Chuck), a vocalist in the group Forgotten Boys. They have a daughter named Nina, in 2010 they separated.

Filmography

Television

Feature films

Theater

Awards and nominations 
 Best Actress at the Premiere Brazil festival by Françoise 2001.
 Best Actress in short film festival in the Golden Kikito by Françoise 2001.
 Best Actress in a Short Film at the awards Candango Trophy by Françoise 2001.
 Newcomer of the Year award for the Domingão Faustão The Clone 2001.
 Best Actress trophy at the awards Candango by Dois Perdidos numa Noite Suja 2002.
 Best Actress in the Cinema Brazil Grand Prize for Dois Perdidos numa Noite Suja 2002.
 Best Actress in Prêmio ACIE de Cinema Dois Perdidos numa Noite Suja 2004.
 Nominated for best romantic couple by Agora São Elas 2003.
 Nominated for Best Actress Award Contigo Award Senhora Do Destination 2004.
 Nominated for Best Actress Award Contigo Award Duas Caras 2007.
 Nominated for best romantic couple Contigo Award Duas Caras 2007.
 Nominated for Meus Prêmios Nick Favorite actress Avenida Brasil 2012
 Nominated for Best of the Year Award (TV Globo) best actress in a telenovela by Avenida Brasil 2013
 Nominated for TV Contigo Award, Outstanding Lead Actress for Avenida Brasil 2013

References

External links

 
 

1979 births
Living people
People from Belo Horizonte
Brazilian people of Italian descent
Brazilian film actresses
Brazilian telenovela actresses